Basketball is one of the 24 sports scheduled for the 2023 Pacific Games which will be held in Honiara, Solomon Islands. This tournament will also served as the qualification for FIBA Oceania to the 2029 FIBA Asia Cup pre-qualifiers.

Competition format
The 8 teams will be split into two pools of four where round-robin matches will be played with the top team from each pool advancing to the semi-finals and the second and third placers from each pool advancing to the semifinals play-offs.

Qualification
The following teams are confirmed for this edition's basketball tournament for both men and women, following the conclusion of regional events and wildcard selection.

Men's tournament

Qualified teams

Women's tournament

Qualified teams

Men's 3x3 tournament

Women's 3x3 tournament

References

 
2023 Pacific Games
2023
2023 in basketball